44th National Board of Review Awards
December 14, 1972
The 44th National Board of Review Awards were announced on December 14, 1972.

Top Ten Films 
Cabaret
Man of La Mancha
The Godfather
Sounder
1776
The Effect of Gamma Rays on Man-in-the-Moon Marigolds
Deliverance
The Ruling Class
The Candidate
Frenzy

Top Foreign Films 
The Sorrow and the Pity
The Emigrants
The Discreet Charm of the Bourgeoisie
Chloe in the Afternoon
Uncle Vanya

Winners 
Best Film:
Cabaret
Best Foreign Film:
The Sorrow and the Pity
Best Actor:
Peter O'Toole - Man of La Mancha, The Ruling Class
Best Actress:
Cicely Tyson - Sounder
Best Supporting Actor:
Al Pacino - The Godfather 
Joel Grey - Cabaret
Best Supporting Actress:
Marisa Berenson - Cabaret
Best Director:
Bob Fosse - Cabaret

External links 
National Board of Review of Motion Pictures :: Awards for 1972

1972
1972 film awards
1972 in American cinema